Korydallos (Latin: Corydallus) is a municipality in the Piraeus regional unit, Greece. It is located in the southwestern part of Athens agglomeration.

Geography
Korydallos is situated southeast of the mountain Aegaleo. It is located 7 km west of central Athens and 4.5 km north of Piraeus. The municipality has an area of 4.324 km2. The main street Taxiarchon has become a well known shopping center with many fashion shops and boutiques. People who live there are usually middle class families or the working class.

Transport
Korydallos metro station of line 3 situated in the city. Also served by busses (OSY).

History

Korydallos was founded in ancient times, and was one of the 100 municipalities of ancient Athens' democratic system at the end of the 6th century BC. Theophilos Corydalleus (1563–1646) was a philosopher who lived in Corydallos. 200 years later, Korydallos was known as Koutsoukari after the property owner of the greater area, Emmanouil Koutsikaris. After that it was renamed into Pachy after the next owner (Pachinas). In 1923, the town was renamed back into its ancient name, Korydallos. The population in 1928 was 2,500. Korydallos was part of the municipality of Athens until 1931 and from 1931 to 1934 of municipality of Piraeus, when it became a separate community. It was elevated to municipality status in 1946. The city now boasts a population of 100,000.

Historical population

Football teams
 Aetos Korydallou
 Kypros Korydallou
 Thuella Korydallou
 Ermis Korydallou

See also
List of municipalities of Attica

References

External links
Official website 
Weather conditions in Korydallos 

Municipalities of Attica
Populated places in Piraeus (regional unit)